Quelfes is a freguesia (parish) in the municipality of Olhão (Algarve, Portugal). The population in 2011 was 17,246, in an area of 28.20 km².

Main sites
Quelfes Church
Quelfes' Roman bridge

References

Freguesias of Olhão